Swaraj Kaushal (born 12 July 1952) is an Indian criminal lawyer practicing in New Delhi. He was designated as a senior advocate by the Supreme Court of India at age 34, and he became the Governor of Mizoram at the age of 37, serving between 1990 and 1993.

Early life
Swaraj Kaushal was born to Madan Lal and Lajyawati on 12 July 1952 in Solan, Patiala and East Punjab States Union {now part of Himachal Pradesh). He received his Bachelor of Arts degree from D.A.V. School, Chandigarh and completed LLB from Faculty of Laws, Panjab University, Chandigarh.

Career
During the Emergency of 1975–77, he defended socialist leader George Fernandes in the famous Baroda dynamite case. He secured release of the underground Mizo leader, Laldenga, in the conspiracy trial in 1979. Thereafter, he was the constitutional adviser to the underground Mizo National Front during negotiations with Government of India. Many years of negotiations resulted in the signing of Mizoram Peace Accord, which he helped write on 30 June 1986, which ended 20 years of insurgency. He was appointed the first Advocate General of Mizoram, the state's premier legal officer in 1987 at the age of 34. He was the youngest-ever advocate general in the country. He is an expert on India's northeast region and its insurgency problem.

He was designated as a senior advocate by Supreme Court of India on 20 December 1986 at the age of 34, a notable achievement in the legal profession.

Governor of Mizoram
He was the Governor of Mizoram from 8 February 1990 to 9 February 1993.

Member of Parliament
He was a member of parliament between 1998 and 2004 as a member of the Haryana Vikas Party, representing the state of Haryana. During 1998-99 and 2000–2004, he was a member of Rajya Sabha.

Personal life
He married Sushma Swaraj on 13 July 1975. Their only child, Bansuri Swaraj, is a graduate from Oxford University and a barrister from Inner Temple. On 6 August 2019, Sushma Swaraj died of a cardiac arrest at AIIMS Delhi following a heart attack in the evening.

References

20th-century Indian lawyers
Living people
Governors of Mizoram
1952 births
Indian Senior Counsel
Rajya Sabha members from Haryana
Haryana Vikas Party politicians
Samyukta Socialist Party politicians